Hône (Valdôtain:  (locally ); Issime ) is a town and comune (population 1,146) in the Aosta Valley region of north-western Italy.

Twin towns

  Nora Municipality,  Sweden, since 2008

Cities and towns in Aosta Valley